Wenaas is a surname. Notable people with the surname include:

Johan Arnt Wenaas (1941–2015), Norwegian priest
Ronald Wenaas (born 1968), Norwegian footballer